Carlos da Silva Costa  (born November 3, 1949 in Oliveira de Azeméis) is a Portuguese economist who served as Governor of the Bank of Portugal from June 7, 2010 to July 20, 2020, when he was succeeded by Mário Centeno.

Career
Carlos Costa started his career in 1973 as a lecturer in economics at the University of Porto and graduated there. Following his graduation he continued his studies at Sorbonne and then in 1981 went to the former Banco Português do Atlântico, now Banco Comercial Português (BCP), research department. As a senior attaché in the Portuguese Permanent Representation to the EU and a member of the EU's economic policy committee from 1986 to 1992, he was engaged in European integration before becoming chief of staff of the Portuguese European Commissioner João de Deus Pinheiro from 1993 to 1999.

Prior to his appointment to the European Investment Bank, Costa had positions on the board of directors at Caixa Geral de Aposentações, a bank for pension funds, Banco Nacional Ultramarino and Itaú Unibanco holdings.

European Investment Bank, 2006–2010
In 2006 Costa became vice president of the European Investment Bank under the leadership of president Philippe Maystadt. He was responsible for the banks' funding financing operations in Spain, Portugal, Belgium and Luxembourg, as well as in Asia and South America. He was also a member of the Committee of European Securities Regulators.

Banco de Portugal, 2010–2020
On 22 April 2010 Costa was nominated for a five-year-term by the Portuguese government, recommended by the Finance minister Teixeira dos Santos. He replaced Vítor Constâncio, who became vice president of the European Central Bank on June 1, 2010.

In this capacity, Costa also holds the following positions:
 European Central Bank (ECB), Ex-Officio Member of the Governing Council
 Single Supervisory Mechanism (SSM), Member of the Supervisory Board
 European Systemic Risk Board (ESRB), Member of the General Board 
 Financial Stability Board (FSB), Member of the Regional Consultative Group for Europe
 International Monetary Fund (IMF), Ex-Officio Member of the Board of Governors
 National Council of Financial Supervisors, Chairman 
 School of Economics and Management of Universidade Católica Portuguesa, Chairman of the Consultative Council

Controversy
In early 2016, Prime Minister António Costa caused controversy by attacking Costa and the central bank for being “irresponsible” by “dragging out” a decision over compensation claimed by commercial paper investors hit by the collapse in 2014 of Banco Espírito Santo (BES). The Left Bloc (BE) and the Portuguese Communist Party (PCP) openly called for Costa to resign. The attacks triggered a political storm over what the centre-right opposition described as a “shameful” attempt to interfere in the regulator's independence.

References

External links
 Bank of Portugal official website
 Biography on Banco de Portugal official website

Governors of the Bank of Portugal
Living people
21st-century Portuguese economists
University of Porto alumni
University of Paris alumni
1949 births
People from Oliveira de Azeméis
Portuguese expatriates in France
20th-century Portuguese economists